Dettah, sometimes, incorrectly, as Detah, is a First Nations community in the North Slave Region of the Northwest Territories, Canada. Located just southeast of the capital of Yellowknife, it is a  drive from that city by ice road across the north arm of Great Slave Lake in winter or a  drive via the Ingraham Trail, year-round. The name means 'Burnt Point' in the Dogrib language and refers to a traditional fishing camp used by the Dene for hundreds of years.

Demographics 

Both it and Ndilǫ are the communities of the Yellowknives. Dettah is represented by the Yellowknives Dene First Nation (Dettah) and are part of the Akaitcho Territory Government.

Gallery

Climate
Dettah has a subarctic climate (Dfc) with long, severely cold winters and short but mild, sometimes warm summers. Dettah and Yellowknife experience the sunniest springs and summers out of all of Canada's cities.

References

Further reading
Northwest Territories, and BHP Billiton Diamonds Inc. Communities and Diamonds Socio-Economic Impacts in the Communities of Behchoko, Gameti, Whati, Wekweeti, Detah, Ndilo, Lutsel Kʼe, and Yellowknife: 2005 Annual Report of the Government of the Northwest Territories Under the BHP Billiton, Diavik and De Beers Socio-Economic Agreements. [Yellowknife]: Govt. of the Northwest Territories, 2006.

External links

Communities in the North Slave Region
Dene communities